Diligence—carefulness and persistent effort or work—is one of the seven heavenly virtues. It is indicative of a work ethic, the belief that work is good in itself.

In students 

Bernard et al. suggest that diligence in students is defined as the effort they put towards balanced and holistic development in mental, physical, social and spiritual dimensions. They find that it correlates with academic performance, especially with younger students, and that the support of parents and educators encourages students to be diligent. Other factors that encourage student diligence include motivation, discipline, concentration, responsibility and devotedness.

In Buddhism 

The last words of the Buddha were, "Strive on with diligence." Diligence is an integral part of all Buddhist teaching, and considered the fourth of the pāramitā. In Mahayana tradition, diligence is the third pāramitā and the first said to lead to liberation, and it is said that its practice brings an increase of qualities.

In Christianity 

In Christianity, diligence is the effort to do one's part while keeping faith and reliance in God. In other words, diligence and faith are two sides of a mystery. One does not know how, despite one's effort, it all works out; but diligence, when combined with faith, assures spiritual success. Diligence as one of seven virtues describes thoroughness, completeness, and persistence of an action, particularly in matters of faith.

In Islam

In Hinduism 

According to Brian Hatcher, the precepts of Hinduism require a person to discover and live a dharmic life, in which they live with right intention with diligence, and with concern for the well-being of others. The Hindus celebrate Diwali, a festival of lights, where Goddess Lakshmi (also called Goddess Sri) is worshipped, who symbolizes thorough preparation, organization, diligence and honesty. Hindus consider these characteristics essential for success and Shubh Labh (ethical profit).

Due diligence 

Due diligence is the amount of diligence required to avoid negligence in professional activities. It commonly arises in major acquisitions where the legal principle of caveat emptor ("let the buyer beware") requires the purchaser to make diligent inquiries about the property or service being sold.

See also

References

External links 

 
 

Virtue
Seven virtues